First to the Moon: The Story of Apollo 8 is a 2018 documentary film about the second crewed spaceflight mission in the United States Apollo space program, which launched on December 21, 1968. Apollo 8 was the first crewed spacecraft to leave low Earth orbit, reach the Moon, orbit it, and return safely to Earth. The film was released in December 2018 and has been screened at The Explorers Club in New York City, the Kansas Cosmosphere, and Arizona State University.

Synopsis 

The film follows the Apollo 8 mission and its crew, featuring archival material from NASA, the National Archives, and the astronauts' own personal collections. One of the many revelations in the film, the documentary discloses that the famed Earthrise photograph captured by Bill Anders was unplanned.

Participants 

 Frank Borman, Commander
 Bill Anders, Lunar Module Pilot
 Jim Lovell, Command Module Pilot

References

External links
 
 

American documentary films
2018 documentary films
Films about the Apollo program
Documentary films about the space program of the United States
Apollo 8
Films about astronauts
Films set in 1968
William Anders
Frank Borman
Jim Lovell
2010s English-language films
2010s American films